Whynter Lamarre (born January 14, 1979 in Lachine, Quebec) is a retired Canadian water polo goaltender. She began playing water polo at age 14, and graduated from McGill University. She was part of the bronze medal winning women's water polo team at the 2001 world championships in Fukuoka, Japan.

See also
 Canada women's Olympic water polo team records and statistics
 List of women's Olympic water polo tournament goalkeepers
 List of World Aquatics Championships medalists in water polo

External links
 

1979 births
Living people
People from Lachine, Quebec
Water polo players from Montreal
Canadian female water polo players
Water polo goalkeepers
Olympic water polo players of Canada
Water polo players at the 2004 Summer Olympics
World Aquatics Championships medalists in water polo
Water polo players at the 2007 Pan American Games
Pan American Games silver medalists for Canada
Pan American Games medalists in water polo
Medalists at the 2007 Pan American Games